Sillitoe tartan is the nickname given to the distinctive black and white chequered pattern, correctly known as dicing, which was originally associated with the police in Scotland. It later gained widespread use in the rest of the United Kingdom and overseas, notably in Australia and New Zealand, as well as Chicago and Pittsburgh in the United States. It is used occasionally elsewhere, including by some Spanish municipal police and in parts of Canada, where it is limited to auxiliary police services.

Based on the diced bands seen on the Glengarries that are worn by several Scottish regiments of the British Army, the pattern was first adopted for police use in 1932 by Sir Percy Sillitoe, Chief Constable of the City of Glasgow Police.

The Sillitoe pattern may be composed of several different colours and numbers of rows depending on local customs, but when incorporated into uniforms or vehicle livery, it serves to uniquely identify emergency services personnel to the public.

Usage by country

Australia 

Blue and white chequers have become the ubiquitous symbol of policing in Australia. The pattern was introduced into Australia by the Commissioner of the South Australia Police in 1961, following a fact-finding tour of Glasgow in 1960. Committee member Sgt. W Rodgers suggested the inclusion during his time in SA Police, as he had observed during his earlier years in England. The police forces of the remaining states and territories progressively adopted the pattern during the 1970s until it was displayed on all Australian police uniforms except that of the Australian Federal Police, who use a black and white Sillitoe tartan on their cap bands.

The Australasian Centre for Policing Research (ACPR) approved a national specification for police vehicle markings in 1995 which saw all vehicles marked with a chequer band stripe running the full length of the vehicle. This was adopted by all states with the exception of New South Wales which eventually adopted the national standard in 2002.

Other coloured chequered patterns may be used to denote other emergency services and particular usage varies from state to state. For example, in New South Wales the Ambulance Service uses red and white chequers on ambulances and paramedic's uniforms, while the State Emergency Service uses orange and white Sillitoe tartan. St John Ambulance uses a white and green pattern on their vehicles and operational uniforms in both South Australia and Victoria. In New South Wales the Roads & Maritime Services Traffic Emergency Patrol have adopted a yellow and purple Sillitoe tartan whereas the Victorian counterpart, VicRoads have adopted a green and white variant.

New Zealand 

General law enforcement in New Zealand is the responsibility of the country's national police service.  The New Zealand Police wear a blue uniform, similar in colour to those found in Australia, and share the same three-row Sillitoe tartan of blue and white.  The pattern is also borne across stab vests and elsewhere. Unlike their Australian counterparts, New Zealand police vehicles do not display Sillitoe tartan markings, but instead are usually marked with Battenberg markings.

United Kingdom 

Introduced by chief constable of Glasgow Sir Percy Sillitoe in 1932, the Sillitoe tartan was an exclusively Scottish phenomenon until introduced in South Australia in 1961. From 1972, within the United Kingdom, the original black and white Scottish version began to rapidly spread throughout England and Wales and it is now used by all police forces in Great Britain. It is worn on peaked caps, baseball caps and equestrian helmets; as well as the bowler hats and cravats of female officers.

Most forces use black and white chequered bands; the City of London Police uses distinctive red and white chequers. The City of London Corporation also run the Hampstead Heath Constabulary and the Billingsgate Market Constabulary (who are no longer attested as constables but retain the historic title), which also use red and white chequers. The Hammersmith and Fulham Parks Constabulary, who are run by the local authority, also originally used red and white chequers in line with the corporate colours of the council but they reverted to the standard type.

Attested cathedral constables, employed at a number of Anglican cathedrals, have adopted a royal blue and white chequered cap band in order to distinguish them from their Home Office police colleagues.

The now defunct Royal Parks Constabulary originally wore green and white chequers, but later changed to the standard police blue and white chequers. The Royal Parks Constabulary Scotland were a separate force to their aforementioned English counterparts and they also used green and white chequers.

While the Sillitoe tartan is not used in the dress uniform of the Police Service of Northern Ireland, it does appear on the force's baseball caps, motorcycle helmets and high-visibility jackets.

Blue and white chequers are also associated with the police, and may be used on vehicles and signage. Subsequent to the launching of Battenburg markings on police vehicles in the 1990s, the police introduced retro-reflective versions of the Sillitoe tartan markings to their uniforms, usually in blue and white, rather than the blue and yellow used on vehicles.

Many police forces have a sky blue and white Sillitoe tartan hatband as part of their PCSOs uniform. This is as a result of moves by the trade union Unison to develop a national law enforcement uniform within the UK.

As a result of this the blue and white Sillitoe tartan has been taken up by a number of municipal organisations, including the London Borough of Newham Law Enforcement and Nottingham City Council Community Protection, who are accredited under the Community Safety Accreditation Scheme.

It is also being taken on by a number of private security organisations (most notably Canary Wharf Security) to project the attributes of public law enforcement.

United States 

Only a few police forces in the US have adopted the chequered pattern: the Chicago Police Department, Cook County Sheriff's Police and Brookfield Police in Illinois, Forest Park Police and Evergreen Park Police in Illinois, Hillside Police in Illinois, the Washington, D.C. police, and the Pittsburgh Police. U.S. police departments prefer to use a two-row pattern, instead of the three-row pattern common in Europe and Australasia. Many other departments in the United States and Canada, while lacking the tartan on their cap bands, have begun using two-row reflective versions as part of the design on high-visibility outer garments and vests.

 Chicago Police Department's pattern is dark blue and white for patrol officers and detectives, and dark blue and gold for sergeants and higher ranks. Sillitoe tartan caps were introduced in 1967. The band is around not only the department's service caps, but winter knit caps, summer baseball-style caps, the campaign hats and horse bridles of the mounted unit, bicycle helmets, and dog collars as well; it is not worn on the fur trim winter hat nor the light blue riot and motorcycle helmets.  The Chicago Police also use the pattern on some signage, graphics, and architectural detail on newer police stations.
 The police of Brookfield, Forest Park, Hillside, and Evergreen Park follow the same colour protocols as nearby Chicago, although Evergreen Park and Hillside use black rather than dark blue, in keeping with their uniforms.
 The Pittsburgh Police use a dark navy blue and gold pattern, in keeping with their uniform colours. The arms of the city of Pittsburgh derive from those of the city's namesake, William Pitt, the Earl of Chatham; both coats of arms display a "fess chequy argent and azure", or a blue and white chequered band across the middle of the shield.  The use of the chequered pattern by the Pittsburgh police is thus not only in keeping with the practice of various police departments, but is also a direct reference to the city's coat of arms and flag.
 Whilst not part of their standard uniform, officers from the Joliet Police Department (Illinois) have been noted to wear a green and white chequerboard band around their hats during the Chicago's Saint Patrick's Day Parade.
 In Florida, Deerfield Beach Fire Station 102 use a yellow and red three-tiered Sillitoe tartan pattern on the sides of their rescue ambulance. This pattern is identical to that used by Fire and Rescue NSW.
 The Washington, D.C. police wear Sillitoe tartan on their uniform sleeves as of the late 2010s.

Spain 

Blue and white Sillitoe tartan is used by the several local Spanish police forces. Both the Toledo and Mijas local  use a three-tiered version on vehicles in a fashion very similar to Australian police vehicles. The Ajuntament de Sóller and Barcelona (Guàrdia Urbana) local Policía both use two-tiered blue and white versions.

Canada 

Use of the Sillitoe tartan is rare in Canada and is usually limited to auxiliary police services.  For example, the Toronto Police Auxiliary wear a red and black chequered band on their caps.

A two-row Chicago-style Sillitoe tartan is borne on the high-visibility vests of the Vancouver Police, Metro Vancouver Transit Police, and other municipal police forces in the Lower Mainland and on Vancouver Island (along the edges of the horizontal and vertical reflective strips), but not on their high-visibility jackets nor other uniforms.

Brazil 

Four police forces, the State of São Paulo Military Police, State of Espírito Santo Military Police, State of Pará Military Police and Federal District Military Police, and also one auxiliary force, the Civil Guard, wear a black and white Sillitoe tartan pattern on their uniforms, mainly on baseball caps and side hats, parts of their fatigue uniforms.

Brunei 

The Royal Brunei Police Force use blue and white Sillitoe tartan on various police vehicles but not on uniforms.

Denmark 

The duty uniforms of the Denmark Politi (Police) feature reflective black and white Sillitoe tartan stripes on the uniform jackets and pants.

Iceland 

The Icelandic Police wear a black-and-white Sillitoe tartan Pattern on shirt and trouser cuffs, lower hems of jackets and on the base of side hats and baseball caps. A blue and yellow pattern is applied as a reflective marking to the lower part of patrol cars as well.

Hong Kong 

The Hong Kong Police Force use, to a limited extent, both two and three-tiered blue and white Sillitoe tartan schemes (Battenburg markings) on traffic vehicles. This pattern appears to be similar to the Australian style of police markings.

Indonesia 
 The Traffic Corps of Indonesian National Police use blue and white Sillitoe tartan markings on uniforms and traffic vehicles.

Malaysia 

The Royal Malaysia Police use a gold and blue Sillitoe tartan on some patrol vehicles and full pattern on some tow trucks, but not on motorbikes, uniforms, or insignia.

Netherlands 

The plan for a national uniform for local municipal enforcement officers contains the Sillitoe tartan patterns on the cap and shirts, sweaters and jackets on a uniform similar to that of the Spanish local police.

Norway 

The different emergency units of Norway can be distinguished by the colour scheme of the Sillitoe tartan, where the checquer pattern alternates between a colour and reflective white squares.

 Police: matte black and reflective white checquer – Used only on clothing uniform
 Fire brigade: reflective red and reflective white checquer – Used on clothing and vehicle uniform
 Ambulance/paramedics: reflective green and reflective white checquer – Used on clothing and vehicle uniform
 Civil defence: blue and white chequer – Used only on clothing uniform

South Africa 

The Durban Metro Police use the same blue and white Sillitoe tartan pattern as Australia on their vehicles, unlike the police vehicles of other cities in South Africa.

See also 

 Battenburg markings
 Black Maria
 Panda car
 Zed-car
 Black and white (police vehicle)
 Jam sandwich (police car)

References

External links 

Emergency vehicles
Visibility
Tartans